Joseph Kono (born 29 December 1950) is a Cameroonian former cyclist. He competed at the 1972, 1976, 1980 and 1984 Summer Olympics.

References

External links
 

1950 births
Living people
Cameroonian male cyclists
Olympic cyclists of Cameroon
Cyclists at the 1972 Summer Olympics
Cyclists at the 1976 Summer Olympics
Cyclists at the 1980 Summer Olympics
Cyclists at the 1984 Summer Olympics
Place of birth missing (living people)